Kroppenstedtia eburnea  is a Gram-positive, spore-forming, filamentous and aerobic bacterium from the genus of Kroppenstedtia which has been isolated from patient samples .

References

External links
Type strain of Kroppenstedtia eburnea at BacDive -  the Bacterial Diversity Metadatabase

Bacillales
Bacteria described in 2011